Dichomeris santarosensis is a moth in the family Gelechiidae. It was described by Ronald W. Hodges in 1985. It is found in Costa Rica.

The length of the forewings is 5.7–7 mm. The forewings are streaked with orange, orange brown, yellowish grey and grey brown. The hindwings are grey brown, with darker and more intensely coloured veins.

The larvae feed on Quercus oleoides.

References

Moths described in 1985
santarosensis